Maria Sophie Amalie, Duchess in Bavaria (4 October 1841, Possenhofen Castle – 19 January 1925, Munich) was the last Queen consort of the Kingdom of the Two Sicilies. She was one of the ten children of Maximilian Joseph, Duke in Bavaria and Princess Ludovika of Bavaria. She was born as Duchess Maria Sophia in Bavaria. She was the younger sister of the better-known Elisabeth of Bavaria ("Sisi") who married Emperor Franz Joseph I of Austria.

Early life 
Maria Sophie was born  on October 4, 1841, at the Possenhofen Castle in Possenhofen, the Kingdom of Bavaria. Her parents were Princess Ludovika of Bavaria and Duke Maximilian Joseph in Bavaria. She was the sixth of ten children and one of the eight that survived to adulthood. She and her siblings enjoyed an unrestricted childhood, shared between Possenhofen Castle in the summers and the Herzog-Max-Palais in Munich.

In the winter of 1857, at the age of 16, Marie Sophie's hand was sought by Francis II, Crown Prince of Naples, Duke of Calabria, and the eldest son of Ferdinand II of the Two Sicilies, King of Naples. The marriage was political, since Ferdinand wished to ally himself with the Emperor of Austria, Franz Josef I, a powerful fellow absolutist. At that time the kingdom was already threatened by revolutionary forces. At that time Marie Sophie had not experienced menarche, and underwent treatments to induce menses. She also had to learn Italian. She was married by proxy. In January 1859 she traveled to Vienna to spend time with her sister before they went to Trieste to formally enter her new kingdom, and say farewell to her family on the Neapolitan royal yacht Fulminante. She set sail for Bari and on 3 February 1859 was married there.

Queen
On 8 January 1859 in Munich at the Allerheiligen-Hofkirche Maria Sophie was married by proxy and then again married in-person on 3 February 1859 in Bari to the Duke of Calabria, the eldest son of Ferdinand II of the Two Sicilies, King of Naples. Within the year, with the death of the king, her husband ascended to the throne as Francis II of the Two Sicilies, and Maria Sophie became queen of a realm that was shortly to be overwhelmed by the forces of Giuseppe Garibaldi and the Piedmontese army.

In September 1860, as the Garibaldine troops were moving towards Naples, his capital, Francis II decided to leave the city. At the beginning, he planned to organise a resistance in Capua. However, after that city had also been lost to the Garibaldines in the aftermath of the battle of the Volturnus (October), he and Marie Sophie took refuge in the strong coastal fortress of Gaeta, 80 km north of Naples.

During the Siege of Gaeta in late 1860 and early 1861, the forces of Victor Emmanuel II bombarded and eventually overcame the defenders. It was this brief "last stand of the Bourbons" that gained Marie Sophie the reputation of the strong "warrior queen" that stayed with her for the rest of her life. She was tireless in her efforts to rally the defenders, giving them her own food, caring for the wounded, and daring the attackers to come within range of the fortress cannon.

Rome 
With the fall of Gaeta and the Kingdom of the Two Sicilies, Marie Sophie and her husband went into exile in Rome, the capital of what for 1,000 years had been the sizeable Papal States, a large piece of central Italy but which, by 1860, had been reduced to the city of Rome, itself, as the armies of Victor Emanuel II came down from the north to join up with Garibaldi, the conqueror of the south. King Francis set up a government in exile in Rome that enjoyed diplomatic recognition by most European states for a few years as still the legitimate government of the Kingdom of the Two Sicilies.

Her wealth and privilege were, to a certain extent, overshadowed by personal tragedies. Her marriage was not consummated for many years, as her husband suffered from phimosis. While in exile in Rome, Marie Sophie became pregnant with an illegitimate child. In order to avoid a public scandal, she gave health reasons to urgently visit her parents' house in Possenhofen. It was decided in a family council that Marie Sophie should retire to the Ursuline Convent in Augsburg, where on 24 November 1862 she gave birth to a daughter who was named Mathilde Marie Sophie Henriette Elisabeth Louise, but commonly known as Daisy. The child was immediately given to foster parents, the Count and Countess de Gineste, who raised her at Castle Garrevaques in Département Tarn. However, Maria Sophie was able to keep in touch with her daughter until she died in January 1886 and even attended her funeral in Paris. This story was revealed by a great-great-grandniece of the Ginestes in a book published in 2021.

Countess Marie Larisch von Moennich, niece of Marie Sophie, had spread the story that the child's father was a Belgian officer of the papal guard named Count Armand de Lavaÿss. Although Countess Larisch's biographer Brigitte Sokop refuted this assertion and speculated that a possible father of the child would be the Spanish diplomat Salvador Bermúdez de Castro (later Duke of Ripalda and Santa Lucía), who was often to be seen in the company of the Neapolitan royal couple and who was also said to have had an affair (and also an illegitimate daughter) with Marie Sophie's sister Mathilde, Countess of Trani, Lorraine Kaltenbach in her 2021 biography of Marie Sophie established that the father of her illegitimate daughter was indeed a certain Félix-Emmanuel de Lavaÿsse, a pontifical zouave, whom officially recognized Daisy as his daughter on 16 May 1867 shortly before his death on 18 April 1868 aged 32.

A year later, on the advice of her family, Marie Sophie decided to confess the affair to her husband.  Afterwards, the relationship between the two improved for a time.  Francis submitted to an operation which allowed him to consummate the marriage, and Marie Sophie became pregnant a second time, this time by her husband. Both were overjoyed at the turn of events and full of hope. On 24 December 1869, after ten years of marriage, Marie Sophie gave birth to a daughter, Maria Cristina Pia.  Cristina was born on the birthday of her aunt, Empress Elisabeth, who became her godmother. Unfortunately, the baby lived only three months and died on 28 March 1870. Marie Sophie and her husband never had another child.

Later life 
In 1870, Rome fell to the forces of Italy and the King and Queen fled to Bavaria. The king died in 1894. Marie Sophie spent time in Munich, and then moved to Paris where she presided over somewhat of an informal Bourbon court-in-exile.  It was rumored she was involved in the anarchist assassination of King Humbert in 1900 in hopes of destabilizing the new nation-state of Italy. Recent historians have resurrected that rumor based on the apparent credence given to this conspiracy theory by the then Prime Minister of Italy, Giovanni Giolitti. Others regard it as anecdotal. In any event, the case against Marie Sophie is circumstantial.

During World War I, Marie Sophie was actively on the side of the German Empire and Austria-Hungary in their war with the Kingdom of Italy. Again, the rumors claimed she was involved in sabotage and espionage against Italy in the hope that an Italian defeat would tear the nation apart and that the kingdom of Naples would be restored.

During her life, she generated an almost cult-like air of admiration even among her political enemies. Gabriele d'Annunzio called her the "stern little Bavarian eagle" and Marcel Proust spoke of the "soldier queen on the ramparts of Gaeta". She and her sister Elisabeth were considered amongst the great beauties of their age.

Maria Sophie died in Munich in 1925.  Since 1984 her remains now rest with those of her husband and their daughter in the Church of Santa Chiara in Naples.

Issue

{| style="text-align:center; width:100%" class="wikitable"
|-
! style="width:20%;"| Name !! style="width:100px;"| Picture !! Lifespan !! Notes 
|-
| Mathilde Marie Sophie Henriette Elisabeth Louise
|| 
|| 24 November 1862 – January 1886
|| 
|-
| 'Maria Cristina Pia Anna Isabella Natalia Elisa'|| 
|| 24 December 1869 – 28 March 1870
|| Died aged 3 months.
|}

Ancestors

Notes and citations
This item originated as an abridged and edited version of an  article that appears in an online encyclopedia of Naples and has been inserted here by the author and copyright holder of that article.

 Bibliography 
 Alio, Jacqueline: Queens of Sicily 1061–1266 (Trinacria: 2018), pp 575–593.

 Translated by George P. Upton.

  (4th edition 2006)
 Van der Kiste, John: The Heroine of Gaeta: Queen Maria Sophia of the Two Sicilies'' (KDP: 2017)

External links
 
 Original source for article
 Family Tree: Duchess Maria Sophie in Bavaria, Queen consort of the Two Sicilies
 Renato Schumacher. The Swiss and the Royal House of Naples-Sicily 1735–1861. A Preview on the 150th Anniversary of the Surrender at Gaeta

1841 births
1925 deaths
19th-century German people
20th-century German people
19th-century German women
20th-century German women
People from Starnberg (district)
House of Wittelsbach
Royal consorts of the Kingdom of the Two Sicilies
Princesses of Bourbon-Two Sicilies
Duchesses of Bavaria
Burials at the Basilica of Santa Chiara
German Roman Catholics
Duchesses of Calabria
Royal reburials